A list of films produced in Japan ordered by year in the 2020s.  For an A-Z of films see :Category:Japanese films.

2020
List of Japanese films of 2020

2021
List of Japanese films of 2021

2022
List of Japanese films of 2022

2023
List of Japanese films of 2023

External links
 Japanese film at the Internet Movie Database

2020s
Japanese
Films